Sharifov is a surname found among traditionally Muslim ethnic groups in the former Soviet Union, meaning "son of the Sharif" (from "Sharif" and the Slavic name suffix "-ov"). Its feminine form is Sharifova. Notable people with the surname include:

Abid Sharifov (born 1940), Azerbaijani politician
Homiddin Sharifov (1947–2007), Tajikistani politician
Samir Sharifov (born 1961), Azerbaijani politician
Sharif Sharifov (born 1988), Azerbaijani wrestler

See also
Sharipov (surname), a similarly-derived surname

Azerbaijani-language surnames
Patronymic surnames
Masculine surnames